Södertörn is a roughly triangular peninsula and artificial island in eastern Södermanland, Sweden, which is bordered by:

Lake Mälaren and the inlet of Saltsjön (a part of the Baltic Sea) to the north,
The Baltic Sea (the Stockholm Archipelago) to the east and the south,
Himmerfjärden and Hallsfjärden (parts of the Baltic Sea) to the west as well as
The Södertälje Canal to the northwest. 

The Södertälje Canal is man-made, so the area isn't fully separated from the mainland by nature. The area is classified as an island by Statistics Sweden, making it the third largest island in Sweden. 

Since 2005, the whole of Södertörn has been included in Metropolitan Stockholm. Before that, the southern parts of the island, which lie within Nynäshamn Municipality, and the western parts, which are in Södertälje Municipality, were – although in Stockholm County – not included in the metropolitan area.

The northern areas of Södertörn are to a large extent made up of rift-valley countryside (and urban areas) with high ground which is either pine forest or bare. The long valleys of the south become level ground. The waters surrounding the area are either freshwater or brackish water with poor salinity. The bedrock is almost entirely gneiss.

It is located in Hanveden, a large area of largely coniferous forest south of Stockholm, whose eastern areas partially form the Tyresta National Park.

The southernmost parts of Södertörn were connected to Stockholm in 1901, when the Nynäs Line was opened. The railway runs between Nynäshamn in the south and Älvsjö in the north, where it joins with the main southern railway.

Etymology
Its name (á [...] Taurinum in 1225, Tør in 1283, a Tørinne in 1383 and eventually ‘‘Södertörn’’ since 1645) derives from the Old Norse dialect word tor, meaning "broken rocky beaches", which cut deep into the coast of Södertörn.

Municipalities of Södertörn
Botkyrka
Haninge
Huddinge
Nacka (west of Skurusundet)
Nynäshamn
Salem
Stockholm (the Söderort, southern, part)
Södertälje (east of the Södertälje Canal)
Tyresö

These municipalities are located both in Stockholm County and the province of Södermanland.

See also

 Södertörn University

References

Geography of Stockholm County
Geography of Södermanland
Peninsulas of Sweden